Leifsson is a surname. Notable people with the surname include:

Brynjar Leifsson (born 1990), guitarist in Of Monsters and Men, an indie folk/pop band from Iceland
Guðgeir Leifsson (born 1951), Icelandic former footballer
Gunnlaugr Leifsson (died 1218), Icelandic scholar, writer and poet
Thorarinn Leifsson (born 1966), Icelandic author and illustrator
Thorkell Leifsson or Leif Ericson (c. 970 – c. 1020), Norse explorer, the first European to land in North America